IBV may refer to:

Institute for Business Value, a unit of Innovation and Research wing of IBM Business Consulting.
Infectious bronchitis virus, the cause of avian infectious bronchitis, an important poultry disease.
ÍBV Vestmannaeyjar, an Icelandic football club
Instituto de Biomecánica de Valencia, Valencia Institute of Biomechanics (Spain)
 Internationale Bibelforscher-Vereinigung, German Jehovah's Witnesses's  association, suppressed by the Nazis